William Wesley Halfyard (October 16, 1869 – December 31, 1944) was an educator and political figure in the Colony of Newfoundland. He represented Fogo from 1913 to 1919, Trinity Bay from 1919 to 1928 and Trinity North from 1928 to 1932 in the Newfoundland House of Academy.

He was born in Ochre Pit Cove, Conception Bay, the son of William Halfyard and Anne Carnell. Halfyard was educated in Ochre Pit Cove and St. John's. He taught school for several years, later becoming principal of the Methodist school in Catalina, where he became involved with the Fishermen's Protective Union. Halfyard served in the Newfoundland Executive Council as Minister of Agriculture and Mines from 1917 to 1919, as Minister of Posts and Telegraphs from 1919 to 1923 and again from 1928 to 1932,  as Minister of Marine and Fisheries in 1923 and as Colonial Secretary from 1923 to 1924. After he retired from politics in 1932, he was named Sheriff of Newfoundland.

Halfyard also served as vice-president of the Union Trading Company, as a member of the board of governors for St. John's General Hospital and as a director of the Government Savings Bank. In 1909, he married Margaret Mary Diamond. He died at home in St. John's at the age of 75.

References 

Fishermen's Protective Union MHAs
1869 births
1944 deaths
Government ministers of the Dominion of Newfoundland
Colonial Secretaries of Newfoundland